Julia Schell (born 13 July 1996) is a Canadian rugby union player. Julia attended University of GuelphUniversity of Guelph and plays for the Guelp Redcoats. Schell studied Sociology. 

Schell debuted against the USA in 2021 and competed for Canada at the delayed 2021 Rugby World Cup in New Zealand. Schell featured in all three Pool games at the World Cup.

Schell primarily plays fly halfFly-half but can also play fullbackFullback (rugby union)

References 

Living people
1996 births
Female rugby union players
Canadian female rugby union players
Canada women's international rugby union players